Garsak, also rendered as Garsag or Gerasg, may refer to:
 Garsak-e Pain